The 2022–23 season is the 96th season in the history of U.S. Lecce and the club's first season back in the top flight
since 2020. The club are participating in Serie A and the Coppa Italia.

Players

First-team squad

Out on loan

Transfers

In

Out

Pre-season and friendlies 

Lecce started training in Folgaria on 30 June.

Competitions

Overall record

Serie A

League table

Results summary

Results by round

Matches 
The league fixtures were announced on 24 June 2022.

Coppa Italia

References 

U.S. Lecce seasons
Lecce